The Commandry of Mirow was a commandry of the Knights Hospitaller, based in Mirow, a town in Mecklenburg-Vorpommern. It existed from 1226 until 1648.

External links
http://www.landesbibliographie-mv.de/REL?PPN=348978170

History of Mecklenburg-Western Pomerania